This article shows the rosters of all participating teams at the women's indoor volleyball tournament at the 2018 Mediterranean Games in Tarragona.

Group A



The following is the Greek roster in the 2018 Mediterranean Games.

Head coach: Guillermo Naranjo Hernandez

The following is the Italian roster in the 2018 Mediterranean Games.

Head coach: Massimo Bellano

Group B







Group C



The following is the Croatian roster in the 2018 Mediterranean Games.

Head coach: Frane Žanić



Group D







References

External links
 Official website

2018
Volleyball at the 2018 Mediterranean Games